Hòa Phú is a rural commune of Hòa Vang District, Da Nang, Vietnam.

Hòa Phú has an area of 90.05 km², the population was 3,942 in 1999, with a population density of 44 people/km².

References

Populated places in Da Nang